Dakota may refer to: 
 Dakota people, a sub-tribe of the Sioux
 Dakota language, their language

Dakota  may also refer to:

Places

United States
 Dakota, Georgia, an unincorporated community
 Dakota, Illinois, a town
 Dakota, Minnesota, a city
 Dakota, Wisconsin, a town
 Dakota (community), Wisconsin, an unincorporated community
 Dakota City, Iowa
 Dakota City, Nebraska
 Dakota County, Minnesota
 Dakota County, Nebraska
 Dakota Formation, a North American geologic unit named for the county
 The Dakotas, a collective term for the states of North and South Dakota
 Dakota Territory (1861–1889)
 Department of Dakota (1866–1911), an administrative district of the U.S. Army

Elsewhere
 Dacota, also spelt Dakota, a town in Aruba

People
 Dakota (given name)
 Dakota (singer), a British singer
 Dakota, a pseudonym of German trance music DJ and producer Markus Schulz

Arts and entertainment
 Dakota North (comics), Marvel Comics character
 Dakota (1988 film), a 1988 film starring Lou Diamond Phillips
 Dakota (1945 film), a 1945 film starring John Wayne
 Dakota (novel), a 2008 book by Martha Grimes
 Dakota (American band), a melodic rock band
 "Dakota" (song), a 2005 UK #1 song by Stereophonics

Brands
 Dakota (cigarette), a brand
 Ritz Dakota Digital, a camera

Sports
 Dakota Bowl, a championship weekend for North Dakota high school football
 SV Dakota, an Aruban football club

Transportation

Air
 Dakota, a military version of the Douglas DC-3
 Dakota II, Royal Air Force designation of impressed Douglas DC-3 aircraft
 Douglas C-47 Skytrain or Dakota, a military transport aircraft
 Variants of the Piper Cherokee light aircraft:
 Dakota, Piper Dakota model PA-28-236 
 Dakota, Piper Turbo Dakota model PA-28-201T

Land
 Dakota MRT station, a Mass Rapid Transit Station in Paya Lebar, Singapore
 Dodge Dakota, light truck
 Shelby Dakota, a limited-production performance version of the Dodge Dakota Sport pickup truck

Water
 SS Dakota (1877), a British passenger steamship that sank off the coast of Anglesey, Wales in 1877
 SS Dakota, an American ocean liner that sank off Yokohama in 1907

Other uses
 Dakota (fossil), a mummified hadrosaur fossil
 The Dakota, New York City apartment building
 Dakota (Warrenton, Virginia), a historic house
 Dakota Jazz Club, Twin Cities, Minnesota

See also
 
 
 North Dakota, a U.S. state
 South Dakota, a U.S. state
 The Dakotas (disambiguation)
 Dakota War of 1862, a conflict between the US and bands of Eastern Sioux
 Lost Dakota, a small, remote exclave of Dakota Territory

Language and nationality disambiguation pages